The Thomasville Times-Enterprise is a five-day newspaper published in Thomasville, Georgia. It is operated by South Georgia Media Group, a division of Community Newspaper Holdings Inc. CNHI acquired the paper in 2000 from Thomson.

A popular columnist for the paper was retired Georgia State Representative Theo Titus, who wrote over 1000 columns on nature, and other subjects, over a twenty-year span from 1986 to 2006. A book was published from an edited collection of his columns, under the title An Outdoor Heritage-stories from a South Georgia Life.

References

External links 
 Thomasville Times-Enterprise Website
 CNHI Website

Thomasville Times-Enterprise
Thomasville Times-Enterprise